Brigada is a Russian television miniseries that debuted in 2002.

Brigada may also refer to:

Brigada (TV program), a Philippines investigative news television program that has aired on GMA News TV since 2011
Brigada Siete, investigative news television show in the Philippines from 1993 to 2001
Brigada Mass Media Corporation, a newspaper company & media network in the Philippines
89.5 Brigada FM, the flagship radio station of Brigada Mass Media Corporation

See also